Ethan Jordan Bortnick (born December 24, 2000) is an American pianist, singer, songwriter, record producer, musician and actor. He has been featured on The Tonight Show, Oprah Winfrey Network, Good Morning America, Disney Channel, Nickelodeon, and his award-winning concert specials on PBS. Ethan has had over 4 national television concert specials. On October 3, 2010 (age 9), Bortnick was listed in the Guinness World Records for "The World's Youngest Solo Musician to Headline His Own Concert Tour".

Bortnick has been featured on national and international television programs. He has helped raise over US$50 million for charities alongside Elton John, Beyoncé, Josh Groban, and more.  In 2011, AEG Network LIVE's broadcast of Ethan Bortnick's Musical Time Machine received two bronze Telly Awards and Bortnick received three bronze Telly Awards in 2014 for The Power of Music.

Bortnick has headlined over 1,000 concerts across the globe.

During the COVID-19 pandemic, Bortnick began offering daily live performances on YouTube.

As of 2022, Bortnick has been releasing pop-classical music. His music has been praised for its unique style and powerful impact by critics.

Early life and education
Bortnick was born in Pembroke Pines, Florida. His parents, Hannah and Gene Bortnick, are Jewish immigrants from Ukraine. He attended a Montessori pre-school. At three years old, he discovered that he had a set of musical skills, including perfect pitch, on a toy keyboard that eventually led him to appearances on many television shows. He stated he has synesthesia.

Career

PBS specials
At 9 years old, Bortnick became the youngest artist to have his own National PBS Concert Special The Power of Music. The Power of Music was rated the number-one concert pledge show on public television for 2014–2015.

In 2017, Bortnick presented the third National PBS television concert "Generations of Music," with a guest appearance by Peter Yarrow (of Peter, Paul and Mary), Bethany Yarrow, and Rufus Cappadocia, also guided by musical director David Rosenthal, and directed by Leon Knoles.

Bortnick started his own nationwide talent search called "Celebration of Music" in 2017. The show travels to various cities across the United States and allows contestants between the ages of 4 to 24 a chance to compete to win the opportunity to perform in a national television show.

Concert in Las Vegas
On July 22 and 23, 2011, at the Las Vegas Hilton, Bortnick became the youngest headliner ever in Las Vegas, at ten years of age.

Recorded album
In August 2011, Bortnick recorded his first album in Muscle Shoals, Alabama. The album was produced by Gary Baker, and he collaborated with Matthew Craig and Rob Collier. The album is the soundtrack to the film Anything is Possible, in which Bortnick plays the leading role.

Melody Street
Bortnick was the host of Melody Street, a 22-minute musical-variety-show for preschoolers. Bortnick and a band of animated musical instruments (Val Violin, Febe Flute, Timmy Trumpet, Heidi Horn, and Sammy Snare) entertained kids with humor, songs, skits, interactive games, backstage dramas, and celebrity musical guests.

Live performances

2007
 Opened Nelly Furtado's first US show on her tour, at the Hard Rock Hotel and Casino in Hollywood, Florida.

2008
 Performed a full concert with the Naples, Florida Philharmonic Orchestra, under the musical direction of Andrew Lane.
 Performed to raise money for the Miami Children's Hospital Foundation's Diamond Ball and Concert, featuring Beyoncé Knowles, Smokey Robinson, and Gloria Gaynor at the American Airlines Arena in Miami, FL. A record US$12 million was raised for the Foundation.
 Co-hosted the Chabad Telethon, which raised US$8 million in one night.

2009
 Performed with the Orlando Philharmonic Orchestra.
 Performed at a fundraiser benefiting the Miami Children's Hospital Foundation with chef Emeril Lagasse.
 Performed at a Parkinson's disease fundraising event hosted by Muhammad Ali
 Performed at a private event for George Davidsohn at the Fontainebleau Hotel backed by members of Billy Joel's band. Bortnick performed with Mark Rivera, Tommy Byrnes, Chuck Burgi, Andy Cichon, and David Rosenthal.
 Performed for the 18th annual Society of Singers Ella Awards, honoring Herb Alpert and Lani Hall.
 Opened for Sir Elton John, Gladys Knight, and Tony Bennett. This event was to raise money for the Starkey Hearing Foundation and was hosted by Billy Crystal.
 Performed, as the sole entertainer, for the Annual Benefit Event of American Friends of Lubavitch.
 Headline performer at the Nokia Theater at LA Live.
 Performed for OneXOne.

2010
 Opened for Jordin Sparks, Jason Derulo, Sam Moore, and David Archuleta for a Super Bowl Party at Miami's Eden Roc Hotel, raising money for various children's charities.
 Performed a solo show at The Grammy Museum for students.
 Performed at the Children Mending Hearts Benefit.
 Performed live at Los Angeles' KCET radio studios during the station's pledge drive.
 Performed at the Delta Awards Ceremony for Children's Miracle Network.
 Performed with Ben Folds and the Nashville Symphony to help raise funds for the Schermerhorn Symphony Center.
 Performed at Haim Saban's IDF fundraising dinner in Beverly Hills, opening for David Foster and Andrea Bocelli.

2011
 Performed at the Mandalay Bay in Las Vegas to raise money for the Remax and Children's Miracle Network Auction.
 Performed in a concert for the Larry King Foundation. Bortnick opened for Mary J. Blige.
 Opened the 27th National Space Foundation Symposium.
 One of the headliners of the 2011 Jacksonville Jazz Festival. Other headliners included Natalie Cole and Herbie Hancock
 Performed the opening act for Marvin Hamlisch in Montreal, Quebec, Canada.

We are the World – 25 for Haiti
On February 1, 2010, Bortnick recorded with some 70 artists the song "We Are the World 25 for Haiti". This was the 25th anniversary of the original recording. The song premiered Friday, February 12, 2010, during the opening ceremony of the Vancouver Winter Olympics.

Radio/print
On February 12, 2010, Bortnick was featured in Rolling Stone in an article titled "Preview the New 'We Are the World ', Plus Meet Nine-Year-Old Singer Ethan Bortnick"

On August 1, 2010, Bortnick was featured in the LIFE section of the USA Today.

On May 1, 2011, Bortnick was featured in the Keyboard Magazine In a section entitled "MAJORminor".

On July 22, 2011, Bortnick was featured in the Las Vegas Review-Journal, in the NEON Entertainment section.

In October 2013, Bortnick was on the Esquire Magazine's 80th anniversary cover, titled "The Life of Man"

On November 18, 2013, Bortnick was interviewed for The Flash List, an entertainment Newsletter in the article "Interview with Piano Prodigy Ethan Bortnick"

On November 19, 2013, Bortnick was featured in GAP brand global celebrity ad campaign.

On November 12, 2015, Bortnick was featured in Keyboard Magazine in an article titled "Piano Men Celebrate the Power of Giving" with David Rosenthal.

On August 25, 2017, Bortnick was featured in Broward Family Life, in the entertainment section.

Discography

Albums
 Anything Is Possible OST (2013)
 Harmonic Minor" (2020)

DVDs/CDs
 Live in Concert "By Me" Ethan Bortnick (2007)
 Ethan Bortnick and His Musical Time Machine (2010)
 Ethan Bortnick in Concert: The Power of Music (2014)

Singles
 "The Champ" (2008)
 "It's All About Music" (2011)
 "Anything Is Possible" (2013)
 "Reason to Believe" (2017)
 "Be Who You Are" (2017)
 "Leave Me Alone" (2019)
 "Start" (2019)
 "Closure" (2019)
 "I Want Red" (2019)
 "The Dino Club" (2020)
 "100 Layers" (2020)
 "Sink and Die" (2020)
 "Final Boss" (2020)
 "5 am" (2020)
 "Soul Eater" (2021)
 "Cut My Fingers Off" (2021)
 "Pull Up to the Bumper" (2021)
 "Prom" (2022)
 "Engravings" (2022)
 "Arsonists" (2022)
 "Happy F*****G Birthday" (2022)
 “Deadly Ever After” (2023)

Tours
 2015 – 2016: The Power of Music 2010 – 2011: Musical Time MachineFilmography
 2013: Anything is PossibleTelevision and guesting
2015 movie "Anything is Possible" as Nathan
 2015: Ethan Presents Himself/host
 2014: The Power of Music Himself/host
 2010: Fox and Friends Christmas Special Himself/Guest
 2010: The Fran Drescher Show Guest/Performer
 2010: The Wendy Williams Show Guest/Performer
 2010: Ethan Bortnick and His Musical Time Machine Himself/host
 2010: Melody Street Himself/host
 2009 – 2012: Canada AM Guest/Performer
 2009: Yo Gabba Gabba (Nickelodeon show) Himself/Guest
 2009: Mornings with Kerri-Anne (Australia) Guest/Performer
 2008 – 2011: The Oprah Winfrey Show Guest/Performer
 2008: Little Einsteins on Disney Channel Himself/Guest
 2007 – 2010: Good Morning America Guest/Performer
 2007 – 2009: The Tonight Show with Jay Leno Guest/Performer
 2007: The Martha Stewart Show Guest/Performer
 2007: Inside Edition Guest/Performer
 2007: Access Hollywood Guest/Performer
 2007: The Early Show'' Guest/Performer

Awards and nominations

Young Artist Awards

|-
| style="text-align:center;"| 2010
| Ethan Bortnick
| Outstanding Instrumentalist
| 
|-

Telly Awards

|-
| style="text-align:center;"| 2011
| Ethan Bortnick
| TV Programs/Segments
| 
|-

Other awards
On April 1, 2014, Ethan was presented with the Next Generation of Hope Award by the USO.

See also
 List of composers

References

External links
 Official site
 

2000 births
Living people
American male composers
21st-century American composers
American male child actors
People from Pembroke Pines, Florida
American male pianists
21st-century American pianists
21st-century American male musicians